Peter Hilse (born 8 May 1962) is a former German racing cyclist. He won the German National Road Race in 1987. He rode in one Tour de France, six editions of the Vuelta a España and one Giro d'Italia. He won stage 16 of the 1989 Vuelta.

Major results

1983
3rd Overall Flèche du Sud
9th Overall GP Tell
1984
2nd Overall GP Tell
1986
1st GP Villafranca de Ordizia
1st Barcelona-Andorra
2nd Overall Vuelta a Andalucía
1st Stages 3 & 5b (ITT)
3rd Klasika Primavera
1987
1st  Road race, National Road Championships
1st Subida al Naranco
2nd Overall Setmana Catalana de Ciclisme
1st Stage 2
5th Overall Vuelta a Andalucía
1988
1st Stage 1 Troféu Joaquim Agostinho
2nd Klasika Primavera
7th Overall Paris–Nice
1989
1st Stage 16 Vuelta a España
1st Subida al Naranco
2nd Overall Vuelta a Castilla y León
3rd Overall Vuelta a Andalucía
9th Overall Vuelta a La Rioja
1990
1st Overall Vuelta a Cantabria
1st Stage 3 Vuelta a Burgos
1991
1st Stage 4 Vuelta a Andalucía
2nd Trofeo Comunidad Foral de Navarra
3rd Overall Volta a la Comunitat Valenciana
1992
8th Overall Vuelta a Andalucía

References

External links
 

1962 births
Living people
German male cyclists
Sportspeople from Freiburg im Breisgau
German cycling road race champions
Cyclists from Baden-Württemberg
20th-century German people